Some states in the United States have a state-named Independent Living Council. While federal funding exists, each state's funding is allocated by the individual state's legislature. Although they can make recommendations, they have few to no powers regarding privately financed single-family homes. At times state Independent Living Councils are caught in a conflict of interest.

States

 :

 :

 : Budget cuts in 2001, along with not spending some funds allocated, made obvious the impact felt by many vulnerable groups.

References

State agencies of the United States